Due or DUE may refer to:

 DUE or DNA unwinding element, the originating site for splitting the DNA helix
 DÜE (Datenübertragungseinrichtung), German for “data communications equipment”
 Due (surname), including a list of people with the name
 Due, Georgia, a ghost town in Fannin County, Georgia, United States
 ISO 639:due, code for the Umiray Dumaget language
 "Due", a song by Raf from the 1993 album Cannibali
 "Due", a song by Mindless Self Indulgence from the 2008 album If
 Due, a character in the anime Magical Girl Lyrical Nanoha Strikers
 Rai Due, an Italian television channel
 Telegiornale Due, an Italian news program broadcast on Rai 2

See also
 Doo (disambiguation)
 Due date (disambiguation)
 Deus (disambiguation)